The Environmental Research Satellite (ERS, alternatively Earth Resources Satellite)  program was a series of small satellites  initially operated by the United States Air Force Office of Aerospace Research. Designed to be launched "piggyback" to other satellites during launch, detaching once in orbit, they were the smallest satellites launched to date—what would today be classified as microsatellites. 33 ERS satellites in six different series were launched between 1962 and 1971, conducting scientific research and serving as test beds to investigate the reliability of new spacecraft components.

Summary of launches

TRS Mk. 1 

The TRS (Tetrahedral Research Satellite) Mk. 1 was developed by Space Technology Laboratories, a subdivision of TRW Inc., as an inexpensive, miniaturized "off-the-shelf" satellite that customers could use to perform simple experiments in orbit. Transmission of data was constant at that time as the spacecraft included neither internal battery nor command system. A transistor-based system provided eight channels of data: five for experiments, two for telemetry calibration, and one for the spacecraft temperature. A  antenna transmitted data. on 136.771 Mhz.

Each TRS satellite was estimated to cost only $25,000 to build, excluding development, launch and mission operations costs.

The Air Force Space Systems Division (AFSSD), then headed by Col. T. O. Wear, was the first and only customer for STL's TRS Mk. 1 satellites, initially purchasing six for its Environmental Research Satellite (ERS) program. Ten TRS Mk. 1 satellites were ultimately produced, designed to research radiation and micrometeoroid flux in Earth orbit. All were launched from Vandenberg Air Force Base attached to primary payloads.

Significant flights

ERS 2 (TRS 1)

At the time it was launched, TRS 1 was the smallest satellite ever placed into orbit. The aluminum spacecraft carried 140 solar cells, producing 600 milliwatts of power, and five radiation-detecting cells. Though the satellite did not separate from its primary satellite, it returned eight minutes of data per orbit to tracking stations below. It was designed to turn off after 90 days of operation. TRS 1 circled the Earth in a Low Earth orbit.

ERS 5, 6, and 9 (TRS 2-4)

Data returned from these three fully successful TRS satellites, circling the Earth in Medium Earth orbits (within the Van Allen Belts), returned valuable data on the effects of orbital radiation on solar cells. Of significance, it was determined that p-on-n silicon cells deteriorated five times more quickly than n-on-p cells. While protective covers did not affect n-on-p degradation, they were shown to be helpful for the more sensitive p-on-n cells. An unexpected result of the solar cell experiment was that, while it had been observed in ground tests that exposure to radiation of the cells' quartz covers and the epoxy adhesive that held them to the cells reduced the light they transmitted (and thus the power generated) to the cells by 15%, such was not observed in orbit.

TRS 2 and 3 marked the first time two satellites were deployed into orbit simultaneously. Data was obtained by NASA's Minitrack communications network in cooperation with the USAF.

TRS Mk. 2 

The TRS Mk. 2 design was a tetrahedron measuring 21 cm on a side. Four were produced: ERS-11 through ERS-14, though only two were launched, both pick-a-back with primary USAF payloads. They were designed to operate for one year, at which point, an onboard timer would shut the satellites off.

Flights

ERS 12 (TRS 5)

Its experiment package detected radiation from all directions, measuring electrons at levels greater than 0.5 and 5 MeV and protons between 10 and 20 eV and 50 to 100 eV. The spacecraft returned data until 1963-10-30.

ERS 13 (TRS 6, "Pygmy")

Spinning once every six seconds, the satellite measured electron and proton levels in the Van Allen Belts with omni-directional radiation detectors—a scintillation counter and a solid-state detector. The onboard transmitter, with a power of 100 mW could only reach ground stations when ERS 13 was within  of Earth. The satellite functioned normally until 1964-10-20, when transmission became erratic. The satellite went silent on 1965-01-25.

 (it is possible that ERS 12 and ERS 13 had the same experiments in their packages)

ORS Mk. 1 
There is no evidence that any Octahedral Research Satellite Mark 1 ever flew.

ORS Mk. 2 
The ORS Mk. 2 design was an octahedron measuring 23 cm on a side. Five were produced: ORS-1 and ORS-2 (ERS-15 through ERS-16), which carried out cold welding experiments in space on a variety of metal samples, and ERS-23 through ERS-25, classified satellites whose flights may have been cancelled.

Both ERS 15 and 16 used actuators for their cold welding experiments, the first (16) making five metal to metal tests, and the second (15) making eight.

ORS Mk. 3 

The ORS Mk. 3 design was an octahedron measuring 28 cm on a side. Two were produced: ORS-3 and ORS-4 (ERS-17 and ERS-18).

Flights

ERS 17 (ORS 3)

Taking advantage of the high-apogee, eccentric orbit of the Vela 3A and Vela 3B satellites, ERS 17 was attached as a "pigmy" satellite, adding negligibly to the payload compared to the Velas launched 20 July 1965 to monitor the Earth for nuclear tests. ERS 17's  apogee and  perigee orbit took it through Earth's Van Allen Belts, which the satellite was designed to investigate, measuring charged particles, X rays, gamma rays, and cosmic rays in the near-earth environment. Approximately 1500 hours of data were collected by the ERS 17's five radiation detectors until November 3, 1965, when the transmitter ceased. Though this was much shorter than the planned lifespan of one year, the satellite had collected a useful data set within the first four weeks of operation. In addition to returning basic scientific data, as well as helping to refine the Vela design by a better understanding of the radiation hazard the satellite series would endure, ERS 17 also monitored for the telltale increase of electron fluxes in the event of nuclear detonations in near space. ERS reentered 1 July 1967.

ERS 18 (ORS 4)

The heavier ERS 18, launched with the next set of Vela satellites with the same mission as ERS 17, operated successfully from launch until thirteen months later, on June 3, 1968, when its transmitter was turned off by the onboard timer, as planned. Analysis of returned data indicated that the intensity of gamma rays of energy greater than 1 MeV were higher than would be expected by simply extrapolating from the intensity of gamma rays of less than 1 MeV energy. This suggested an additional, as yet undetermined source of high intensity gamma rays.

As of 8 June 2022, ERS 18 is still in orbit, and its position can be tracked on-line.

OV5 

The design of the OV5 (Orbiting Vehicle 5) series was based on the ORS Mk. 3 design and its vehicles were also given ERS numbers. Nine were produced: OV5-1 through OV5-9. These were very small satellites launched pick-a-back with primary payloads since 1962—a natural fit under the Orbiting Vehicle umbrella. The primary innovation over the earlier ERS series was a command receiver, allowing instructions to be sent from the ground, and a Pulse-code modulation  digital telemetry system, versus the analog transmitters used on prior ERS missions. Like prior ERS, the OV5s were spin-stabilized and heat was passively controlled. All of the OV5 series were built by TRW with the exception of OV5-6, built by AFCRL, and OV5-9, built by Northrop Corporation.

OV5 Missions

TETR 

TETR (also known as TTR and TATS, all standing for "Test and Training Satellite") was a series of octahedral ERS satellites which were built to train Apollo program ground station crews for the Manned Space Flight Network. Four were produced: TTR-1 through TTR-4 (ERS-30 through ERS-33) TETR 2 supported training for Apollo missions 8 through 13 despite a faulty battery pack. TETR C failed to orbit due to a failure in the launch vehicle.

References 

Satellites of the United States Air Force
Microsatellites
1962 in spaceflight
1963 in spaceflight
1964 in spaceflight
1965 in spaceflight
1966 in spaceflight
1967 in spaceflight
1968 in spaceflight
1969 in spaceflight
1971 in spaceflight